The 2016 Georgia State Panthers baseball team represented Georgia State University in the 2016 NCAA Division I baseball season. The Panthers played their home games at the GSU Baseball Complex.

Personnel

2016 roster

Coaching staff

Schedule

! style="background:#0000FF;color:white;"| Regular Season
|- valign="top" 

|- bgcolor="#ccffcc"
| 1 || February 19 ||  || GSU Baseball Complex || 3–2 || 1–0 || –
|- align="center" bgcolor="#ffccc"
| 2 || February 20 || VCU || GSU Baseball Complex || 6–8 || 1–1 || –
|- align="center" bgcolor="#ffccc"
| 3 || February 21 ||  || GSU Baseball Complex || 3–5 || 1–2 || –
|- bgcolor="#ccffcc"
| 4 || February 26 ||  || GSU Baseball Complex || 22–4 || 2–2 || –
|- bgcolor="#ccffcc"
| 5 || February 27 || Coppin State || GSU Baseball Complex || 17–0 || 3–2 || –
|- bgcolor="#ccffcc"
| 6 || February 27 || Coppin State || GSU Baseball Complex || 12–0 || 4–2 || –
|- bgcolor="#ccffcc"
| 7 || February 28 || Coppin State || GSU Baseball Complex || 13–0 || 5–2 || –
|-

|- align="center" bgcolor="#ffccc"
| 8 || March 1 ||  || Atlanta, GA || 6–11 || 5–3 || –
|- align="center" bgcolor="#ffccc"
| 9 || March 4 ||   || GSU Baseball Complex || 0–3 || 5–4 || –
|- bgcolor="#ccffcc"
| 10 || March 5 || Minnesota || GSU Baseball Complex || 4–3 || 6–4 || –
|- align="center" bgcolor="#ffccc"
| 11 || March 6 || Minnesota || GSU Baseball Complex || 6–11 || 6–5 || –
|- bgcolor="#ccffcc"
| 12 || March 8 || || GSU Baseball Complex || 4–3 || 7–5 || –
|- align="center" bgcolor="#ffccc"
| 13 || March 12 ||   || GSU Baseball Complex || 1–2 || 7–6 || –
|- bgcolor="#ccffcc"
| 14 || March 12 || Fairmont State || GSU Baseball Complex || 8–5 || 8–6 || –
|- align="center" bgcolor="#ffccc"
| 15 || March 13 ||  || GSU Baseball Complex || 12–13 || 8–7 || –
|- bgcolor="#ccffcc"
| 16 || March 14 || Jackson State || GSU Baseball Complex || 11–5 || 9–7 || –
|- align="center" bgcolor="#ffccc"
| 17 || March 15 ||   || GSU Baseball Complex || 6–10 || 9–8 || –
|- align="center" bgcolor="#ffccc"
| 18 || March 18 ||  || GSU Baseball Complex || 1–11 || 9–9 || 0–1
|- bgcolor="#ccffcc"
| 19 || March 19 || Arkansas State || GSU Baseball Complex || 5–4 || 10–9 || 1–1
|- bgcolor="#ccffcc"
| 20 || March 21 || Arkansas State || GSU Baseball Complex || 14–6 || 11–9 || 2–1
|- bgcolor="#ccffcc"
| 21 || March 22 || Savannah State || GSU Baseball Complex || 4–1 || 12–9 || 2–1
|- align="center" bgcolor="#ffccc"
| 22 || March 24 || Louisiana–Lafayette || Lafayette, LA || 2–4 || 12–10 || 2–2
|- align="center" bgcolor="#ffccc"
| 23 || March 25 || Louisiana–Lafayette|| Lafayette, LA || 1–7 || 12–11 || 2–3
|- align="center" bgcolor="#ffccc"
| 24 || March 26 || Louisiana–Lafayette || Lafayette, LA || 2–4 || 12–12 || 2–4
|- bgcolor="#ccffcc"
| 25 || March 30 || Mercer || Macon, GA || 10–6 || 13–12 || 2–4
|-

|- align="center" bgcolor="#ffccc"
| 26 || April 1 ||  || GSU Baseball Complex || 5–9 || 13–13 || 2–5
|- align="center" bgcolor="#ffccc"
| 27 || April 2 || Texas-Arlington|| GSU Baseball Complex || 16–18 || 13–14 || 2–6
|- bgcolor="#ccffcc"
| 28 || April 3 || Texas-Arlington || GSU Baseball Complex || 8–7 || 14–14 || 3–6
|- align="center" bgcolor="#ffccc"
| 29 || April 5 ||  || Auburn, AL || 4–7 || 14–15 || 3–6
|- bgcolor="#ccffcc"
| 30 || April 8 ||  || Little Rock, AR || 7–5 || 15–15 || 4–6
|- align="center" bgcolor="#ffccc"
| 31 || April 9 || Arkansas–Little Rock || Little Rock, AR || 2–15 || 15–16 || 4–7
|- align="center" bgcolor="#ffccc"
| 32 || April 10 || Arkansas–Little Rock || Little Rock, AR || 7–9 || 15–17 || 4–8
|- bgcolor="#ffffff"
| 33 || April 12 ||  || GSU Baseball Complex || Cancelled || – || –
|- bgcolor="#ccffcc"
| 34 || April 15 ||  || Monroe, LA || 7–3 || 16–17 || 5–8
|- align="center" bgcolor="#ffccc"
| 35 || April 16 || Louisiana-Monroe || Monroe, LA || 0–14 || 16–18 || 5–9
|- align="center" bgcolor="#ffccc"
| 36 || April 17 || Louisiana-Monroe || Monroe, LA || 3–5 || 16–19 || 5–10
|- align="center" bgcolor="#ffccc"
| 37 || April 20 || Georgia Tech || GSU Baseball Complex || 5–11 || 16–20 || 5–10
|- bgcolor="#ccffcc"
| 38 || April 22 ||  || GSU Baseball Complex || 10–0 || 17–20 || 6–10
|- align="center" bgcolor="#ffccc"
| 39 || April 23 || Appalachian State || GSU Baseball Complex || 5–6 || 17–21 || 6–11
|- bgcolor="#ccffcc"
| 40 || April 24 || Appalachian State || GSU Baseball Complex || 5–4 || 18–21 || 7–11
|- bgcolor="#ccffcc"
| 41 || April 27 ||  || GSU Baseball Complex || 4–3 || 19–21 || 7–11
|- align="center" bgcolor="#ffccc"
| 42 || April 29 ||  || GSU Baseball Complex || 3–9 || 19–22 || 7–12
|- bgcolor="#ccffcc"
| 43 || April 30 || South Alabama || GSU Baseball Complex || 7–4 || 20–22 || 8–12
|-

|- align="center" bgcolor="#ffccc"
| 44 || May 1 || South Alabama || GSU Baseball Complex || 1–2 || 20–23 || 8–13
|- bgcolor="#ccffcc"
| 45 || May 3||  || GSU Baseball Complex || 13–5 || 21–23 || 8–13
|- bgcolor="#ccffcc"
| 46 || May 4 || Alabama A&M || GSU Baseball Complex || 8–7 || 22–23 || 8–13
|- align="center" bgcolor="#ffccc"
| 47 || May 6 ||  || San Marcos, TX || 2–6 || 22–24 || 8–14
|- align="center" bgcolor="#ffccc"
| 48 || May 7 || Texas State || San Marcos, TX || 1–10 || 22–25 || 8–15
|- bgcolor="#ccffcc"
| 49 || May 8 || Texas State || San Marcos, TX || 10–9 || 23–25 || 9–15
|- align="center" bgcolor="#ffccc"
| 50 || May 10 || Kennesaw State || Kennesaw, GA || 2–3 || 23–26 || 9–15
|- align="center" bgcolor="#ffccc"
| 51 || May 13 ||   || GSU Baseball Complex || 2–4 || 23–27 || 9–16
|- align="center" bgcolor="#ffccc"
| 52 || May 14 || Troy || GSU Baseball Complex || 3–9 || 23–28 || 9–17
|- align="center" bgcolor="#ffccc"
| 53 || May 15 || Troy || GSU Baseball Complex || 3–16 || 23–29 || 9–18
|- align="center" bgcolor="#ffccc"
| 54 || May 19 ||   || Statesboro, GA || 6–0 || 23–30 || 9–19
|- bgcolor="#ccffcc"
| 55 || May 20 ||  Georgia Southern || Statesboro, GA || 5–4 || 24–30 || 10–19
|- align="center" bgcolor="#ffccc"
| 56 || May 21 ||  Georgia Southern || Statesboro, GA || 5–1 || 24–31 || 10–20
|-

References

Georgia State
Georgia State Panthers baseball seasons